General Guy Stanley Meloy Jr.  (September 4, 1903 – December 14, 1968) was a U.S. Army general, World War II and Korean War veteran, and served as commander of all U.S. forces in Korea during the Cold War.

Early life and education

Meloy was born in Lanham, Maryland on September 4, 1903. After graduating from McKinley Technology High School in Washington D.C., he was appointed to the United States Military Academy. He graduated from West Point in 1927 with a Bachelor of Science degree and was commissioned as a second lieutenant in the infantry.

Career
One of his early assignments was with the first tank destroyer battalion to be organized in the United States Army. He followed this assignment by attending the British Army's anti-tank school, and upon his return to the U.S. was assigned to Camp Hood (later Fort Hood) as one of the first five officers at the now defunct Tank Destroyer Center. During World War II he served in Europe as chief of staff of the 103rd Infantry Division, and was chief of staff of the Airborne Center at Fort Bragg, North Carolina.

1940s
From 1946 to 1948 he was professor of military science and tactics at Texas A&M University. He next served as commander of the 19th Infantry Regiment(United States) of the 24th Infantry Division at Camp Chickamauga in Beppu, Kyushu, Japan.

1950s
He deployed to the Korean War, where he was seriously wounded in action while serving as the Commanding Officer, 19th Infantry Regiment, 24th Infantry Division on July 16, 1950. This occurred during the action that resulted in him receiving the Distinguished Service Cross. Later he commanded the United States Army Infantry School at Fort Benning, and the 1st Infantry Division in Europe, where he oversaw the unit's redeployment to Fort Riley. He was the Chief of Public Information at the Department of the Army and later commanded Fourth United States Army at Fort Sam Houston in 1958 and then served as the commander of VII Corps in Europe.

1960s
He received his fourth star in 1961 and became the commander-in-chief of the United Nations Command, Korea, commander United States Forces Korea, commanding general of Eighth United States Army and commanding general of the Seventh United States Army, headquartered at Stuttgart in West Germany.

Personal life
On November 16, 1960 he married Therese Susan Graves, (née Fischer) from San Antonio, Texas.

Later life and death
He retired at the age of 60 in 1963, and died on December 14, 1968. He is buried with his first wife Catherine, who preceded him in death in 1959, in Arlington National Cemetery.

In retirement, he served as mayor of Terrell Hills, Texas, and was active in the San Antonio chapter of the Association of the United States Army, which established a scholarship in his name in 1970. His son, Guy S. Meloy III, retired from the U.S. Army as a major general.

Awards
Meloy's awards included the Combat Infantryman Badge, Distinguished Service Cross, Distinguished Service Medal, Legion of Merit, Bronze Star Medal, Purple Heart, and Army Commendation Medal

Notes

1903 births
1964 deaths
United States Army generals
United States Military Academy alumni
United States Army personnel of World War II
United States Army personnel of the Korean War
Recipients of the Distinguished Service Cross (United States)
Recipients of the Distinguished Service Medal (US Army)
Recipients of the Legion of Merit
People from Lanham, Maryland
Mayors of places in Texas
Burials at Arlington National Cemetery
20th-century American politicians
Commanders, United States Forces Korea